HMS Collingwood is a stone frigate (shore establishment) of the Royal Navy, in Fareham, England. It is the lead establishment of the Maritime Warfare School and the largest naval training organisation in Western Europe. The Maritime Warfare School is a federated training establishment incorporating HMS Excellent, the Defence Diving School, the RN Physical Training School, the School of Hydrography and Meteorology in Plymouth and the Royal Marines School of Music in Portsmouth Naval Base.

History
HMS Collingwood gained its name from Lord Collingwood, a distinguished admiral at the turn of the 19th century. The current shore establishment was commissioned as the fourth HMS Collingwood on 10 January 1940, initially to instruct "hostilities only" ratings of the seaman branch. Wireless telegraphy ratings started their training in June 1940, and a radio direction finding school was added in 1942. In 1946 Collingwood took over the training of both officers and ratings in the maintenance of all electrical and radio equipment in the fleet, except that of the Fleet Air Arm.

In spring 2007, the Maritime Warfare Centre relocated to HMS Collingwood from HMS Dryad (now the tri-service establishment Southwick Park) and Portsdown Technology Park.

The motto is Ferar unus et idem (Latin: "I shall carry on regardless").

Collingwood, along with Britannia Royal Naval College, undertook this role due to HMS Raleigh training at maximum capacity due to a surge in recruitment.

Cadets

The establishment is also home to the Royal Naval Cadets of HMS Collingwood Royal Naval Volunteer Cadet Corps. The VCC is open to young people aged 9 to 16 who can serve until their 18th birthday as well as adult volunteers from the age of 18 to 65.

References

External links
 
 HMS Collingwood Officers Association
 Volunteer Cadet Corps

Education in Hampshire
Royal Navy bases in Hampshire
Royal Navy shore establishments
Fareham
Military installations established in 1940